Anna Schuleit Haber (born 1974) is a visual artist whose work engages a range of media, technologies, and environments. The range of work extends from sound systems in psychiatric institutions that turn architecture into a vessel or body of sound; collaborations with computer scientists and architects for a contemporary oracle; to projects that involve type designers and dying newsprint media, live sod and thousands of flowers in a hospital, mirrors, bodies of water and an uninhabited island, and a body of water as an environmental mirror. Her current work revolves around seriality and memory, and includes a series of 104 paintings based on Thomas Bernhard’s short fiction, as well as large-scale drawing commissions for architectural settings.

Biography 
Anna attended high school in the United States at Northfield Mount Hermon School before studying painting and art history at the Rhode Island School of Design where she received her B.F.A. in 1998, and creative writing / book arts at Dartmouth College (M.A.L.S. in 2005). In 2013 Schuleit married composer Yotam Haber.

Work 
Schuleit Haber's work has been featured in exhibitions at the Institute of Contemporary Art, Boston, the Museum of Fine Arts, Boston; the University of Massachusetts Amherst; Bowdoin College in Brunswick, Maine; the Brattleboro Museum & Art Center; The Matzo Files, New York; the Mousonturm, Frankfurt, Germany; and the Carpenter Center at Harvard University, among others.

She has been a fellow at the Radcliffe Institute for Advanced Study, the RISD European Honors Program in Rome, the MacDowell Colony, Yaddo, Blue Mountain Center, the Banff Centre, and the Bogliasco Foundation.

In 2006 Schuleit Haber was named a MacArthur Fellow for work that has "conceptual clarity, compassion, and beauty".

Recent exhibitions include a two-person show of paintings at Sapar Contemporary and a solo-show at Coleman Burke Gallery in New York City, as well as set designs at the Chocolate Factory Theater and New York Live Arts in New York. A large outdoor commission, "Just a Rumor", was commissioned by the University Gallery at the University of Massachusetts in Amherst, 2010-11. She served as visiting artist at the Eastman School of Music in Rochester, NY, collaborating with students on a five-part work that linked specific color combinations in her paint palette with musical intervals. The project, "Room for Five", was premiered in the 2012 Warren and Patricia Benson Forum on Creativity.  In 2013 she launched "The Voice Imitator" project, for which she was awarded a 2013 NYFA grant. The project encompasses a series of 104 paintings based on 104 short stories by the Austrian writer Thomas Bernhard. In 2015 she was commissioned to serve as the embedded visiting artist in a local newspaper newsroom, taking over the front pages of 26 issues and creating a collaborative alphabet with typographers from around the world.

References

External links
 Anna Schuleit's Website
 Profile Page at the MacArthur Foundation
 Profile Page at Radcliffe Institute for Advanced Studies
 Artist Page at Coleman Burke Gallery
 Interview with Lybba, 2012
 Interview with Colossal, 2012
 Interview with Tift Merritt on KRTS Marfa, Texas Public Radio, 2011

1974 births
Living people
MacArthur Fellows
American contemporary painters
21st-century American painters
20th-century German painters
21st-century German painters
German women painters
Rhode Island School of Design alumni
Dartmouth College alumni
Northfield Mount Hermon School alumni
20th-century German women
21st-century German women
Yaddo alumni